Fabien Boyer (born 12 April 1991) is a professional footballer who plays as a centre-back for JS Saint-Pierroise in the Réunion Island. Born in France, he represents the Madagascar national team at international level.

Club career
Boyer started his career with Jura Sud, where he made 19 league appearances during the 2010–11 season. In the summer of 2011, he joined the Rennes' reserve team and played 20 matches in the CFA 2, before moving to Angers ahead of the 2012–13 campaign. He made his professional debut in the 1–0 win over Sedan on 27 July 2012.

On 17 July 2018, Boyer suffered a cruciate ligament rupture in a pre-season friendly for Grenoble against Annecy, which restricted him to playing only one match for the rest of the season.

After being without a club for almost a year, Boyer signed for Annecy on 12 June 2020, who had recently been promoted to the Championnat National, the third division of France. His contract was terminated in February 2021, without playing a game for Annecy. Later in the same month, Boyer moved to the Réunion Island and joined AS Excelsior. He played there for a few months, before joining fellow league club JS Saint-Pierroise in the beginning of 2022.

International career
Boyer was born in France and is of Malagasy descent. He made his debut for the Madagascar national team in a 1–1 friendly tie with Comoros on 11 November 2017.

References

External links
Fabien Boyer profile at foot-national.com

1991 births
Living people
Sportspeople from Vienne, Isère
People with acquired Malagasy citizenship
Malagasy footballers
Malagasy expatriate footballers
Madagascar international footballers
French footballers
French expatriate footballers
French sportspeople of Malagasy descent
Footballers from Auvergne-Rhône-Alpes
Association football defenders
Olympique Lyonnais players
FC Villefranche Beaujolais players
Louhans-Cuiseaux FC players
Toulouse FC players
AS Monaco FC players
Jura Sud Foot players
Stade Rennais F.C. players
Angers SCO players
LB Châteauroux players
K.V. Kortrijk players
US Créteil-Lusitanos players
Grenoble Foot 38 players
FC Annecy players
AS Excelsior players
JS Saint-Pierroise players
Ligue 2 players
Championnat National players
Belgian Pro League players
French expatriate sportspeople in Belgium
Malagasy expatriate sportspeople in Belgium
Expatriate footballers in Belgium